Fuseini Issah( born 2 February 1975) is a Ghanaian politician and member of the Seventh Parliament of the Fourth Republic of Ghana representing the Okaikwei North Constituency in the Greater Accra Region on the ticket of the New Patriotic Party.

References

Ghanaian MPs 2017–2021
1975 births
Living people
Ghanaian Muslims
New Patriotic Party politicians
Presbyterian Boys' Senior High School alumni